The 2018 VCU Rams baseball team was the program's 48th baseball season. It was their 6th season the Atlantic 10 Conference.

Roster

Regular season

Results

Game log 

{| class="toccolours" width=95% style="clear:both; margin:1.5em auto; text-align:center;"
|-
! colspan=2 style="" | 2018 VCU Rams Baseball Game Log
|-
! colspan=2 style="" | Regular Season
|- valign="top" 
|

Notes 

The Feb. 17 game between Liberty and VCU was postponed due to inclement weather. The game was rescheduled to Feb. 18 at 1:00 p.m., while the originally planned Feb. 18 game was rescheduled to 4 p.m.

References 

Vcu
VCU Rams baseball seasons
VCU Rams baseball
Vcu baseball